Çatalca (Metrae) is a city and a rural district in Istanbul, Turkey. It is the largest district in Istanbul by area.
It is in East Thrace, on the ridge between the Marmara and the Black Sea. Most people living in Çatalca are either farmers or those visiting vacation homes. Many families from Istanbul come to Çatalca during weekends to hike in the forests or have picnics.

History

Antiquity 
Çatalca's ancient Greek name was Ergisce or Ergiske. It was an ancient Greek city in Thrace, located in the region of the Propontis. 
According to ancient texts, the Greek name is after Ergiscus (Ἐργίσκος), a son of Poseidon through the naiad (nymph) Aba (Ἄβα). In Greek mythology, Aba was a nymph and she is presumed to be a daughter of the river Hebros.
The site is now occupied in part by modern Çatalca.
Under Roman rule, it was named Metrae or Metre and was important enough in the Late Roman province of Europa to become a suffragan of its capital Heraclea's Metropolitan Archbishop, yet was to fade.

Modern period 

Çatalca was settled throughout the Ottoman period and according to the Ottoman Official Statistics of 1910 the majority of the area were Greeks. The Crimean War caused a mass exodus of Crimean Tatars towards Ottoman lands. A few Crimean Tatars settled in Çatalca.
In the First Balkan War the Bulgarian army had driven the Turkish forces back from the border, but the Turkish forces retreated to the prepared positions at Çatalca where on 16–17 November 1912 they defeated the Bulgarians at the "First Battle of Çatalca". The Çatalca fortifications formed a line across the peninsula, the "Chataldja line", which became the armistice line of 3 December 1912, after Bulgaria decided not to attack Adrianople at that time. Upon expiration of the armistice, on 3 February [O.S. 21 January] 1913, hostilities recommenced and the Second Battle of Çatalca began. It was a series of thrusts and counter-thrusts by both the Ottomans and the Bulgarians and lasted until 3 April 1913. There were a large number of journalists who reported on the military actions at Çatalca, whose accounts provide rich details about this event.
According to the Ottoman population statistics of 1914, the kaza of Çatalca had a total population of 30.165, consisting of 16.984 Greeks, 13.034 Muslims, 53 Jews, 44 Armenians, 40 Bulgarians and 10 Roma people.
Before 1930, Çatalca also covered present districts of Arnavutköy, Beylikdüzü, Büyükçekmece, western parts of Başakşehir, rural parts of Eyüp and Sarıyer. In 1930 county (bucak) of Kilyos was part of district of Sarıyer, used to be part of Beyoğlu. At same time, villages of Odayeri, Ağaçlı, İhsaniye and Kısırmandıra (Işıklar after 1987) were passed to Kemerburgaz county (formerly part of Beyoğlu district) of Sarıyer. In 1963, villages as Arnavutköy, Bolluca, Hacımaşlı, Haraççı and İmrahor of Boyalık (its center was Hadımköy) county part of district of Gaziosmanpaşa, formerly part of Eyüp.  In 1972 Tayakadın village of Boyalık county and Yeniköy one of it were passed to Gaziosmapaşa. In 1987 county of Büyükçekmece was separated and become district. Finally in 2009 remainder of Boyalık county was passed to Arnavutköy, was part of Gaziosmanpaşa and Muratbey village was passed to Büyükçekmece.

Population 
As of a November 22, 2000 census, the population of Çatalca district was 81,589, while the city of Çatalca had a population of 36,544 in 2009. The population growth rate was 0.66%. The literacy rate was 99%.

Geography 
Çatalca has an area of 1,715 km² and 135 kilometers of coastline. Its neighbors include Çatalca to the south, and Silivri and Tekirdağ Province to the west. Avcılar, Küçükçekmece, and Arnavutköy lie to the east.
Fresh water for Istanbul is provided from by lakes Durusu and Çatalca.
Yalıköy is a seaside resort of Çatalca. The Çilingoz Nature Park west of Yalıköy offers camping and outdoor recreation activities.

Media 
At Çatalca, there is a mediumwave broadcasting station with a 226 metres tall mast. It works on 702 kHz with 600 kW.

International relations

Twin towns and sister cities 
Çatalca is twinned with:
  Fancy, Saint Vincent and the Grenadines
  Oran, Algeria
  Diego Garcia, British Indian Ocean Territory
  Hitadhoo, Maldives
  Ganja, Azerbaijan
  Lille, France
  Kule, Botswana

Gallery

References

External links 

 District governor's official website 
 District municipality's official website 
 Çatalca local news website  
 GCatholic with titular incumbent bio links

 
Cities in Turkey
Populated places in Istanbul Province
Districts of Istanbul Province